Jozef Čapkovič (born 11 January 1948 in Bratislava, Czechoslovakia) is a former Slovak football player. He played for Czechoslovakia, for which he played 16 matches.

He was a participant at the 1976 UEFA European Championship, where Czechoslovakia won the gold medal.

He played mostly for Slovan Bratislava. His twin brother Ján was also a successful footballer.

From 1992 to 1994 he was a Member of the National Council for the Slovak National Party. He unsuccessfully ran for a parliament seat again in 2010.

References

1948 births
Living people
Slovak footballers
Czechoslovak footballers
UEFA Euro 1976 players
UEFA European Championship-winning players
Czechoslovakia international footballers
ŠK Slovan Bratislava players
Slovak twins
Twin sportspeople
Association football midfielders
Footballers from Bratislava
FK Inter Bratislava players
Members of the National Council (Slovakia) 1992-1994